The Basilica of the Assumption of the Blessed Virgin Mary was a basilica in Székesfehérvár, Hungary.  From the year 1000 until 1527, it was the site of the coronation of the Hungarian monarch.  After the Ottomans occupied the city in 1543, coronations of the Hungarian monarch moved elsewhere; the building was extensively damaged in a fire in 1601.  It was replaced by the Cathedral Basilica of Székesfehérvár in 1777.

Background
The Basilica of the Assumption of the Blessed Virgin Mary was built in the late 1010s by Saint Stephen I, the first King of Hungary. It was never episcopal, but it was used as the principal church of the rulers of Hungary.

The basilica was the most significant place of the Kingdom of Hungary in the Middle Ages, as it contained the crown jewels, including the throne, the Holy Crown of Hungary, the treasury and the archives. 37 kings and 39 queens were crowned in this basilica and 15 were buried in it. In 1543, the Turks occupied Székesfehérvár. The royal graves were ransacked and the basilica was used to store gunpowder, while St. Martin's Cathedral in Pozsony (today Bratislava, Slovakia) became the new coronation site.

In 1601, the building was destroyed by fire. During this time, the Ottoman rule of the city was interrupted for about one year.

Its ruins were demolished and used for the construction of the new episcopal residence and for the reconstruction of another old church which in the 18th century became the cathedral of the Diocese of Szekesfehervar, erected in 1777.

In the late 1930s, St. Stephen's Mausoleum was erected behind the Basilica's ruined apse.

Burials 

Thirteen kings and two queens consort were buried in Székesfehérvár Basilica.

Stephen I
Coloman
Béla II
Géza II
Bela III, whose remains were later moved to Matthias Church, Budapest
Agnes of Antioch, whose remains were later moved to Matthias Church, Budapest
Ladislaus III
Béla IV
Charles I Robert
Maria of Bytom
Louis I
Elizabeth of Bosnia, whose remains were moved to Székesfehérvár Basilica from the Church of St Chrysogonus in Zadar
Albert
Matthias I
Vladislaus II
Louis II

Family members of the kings of Hungary have also been buried in the basilica, such as Catherine, the eldest daughter and heiress presumptive of King Louis I by Elizabeth of Bosnia.
Philip Drugeth and Pipo of Ozora are buried here as well.

Gallery

See also
 Roman Catholicism in Hungary
 List of cathedrals in Hungary

References 

Buildings and structures in Székesfehérvár
Catholic Church in Hungary
Roman Catholic cathedrals in Hungary
Basilica churches in Hungary
Buildings and structures in Fejér County
Szekesfehervar
Szekesfehervar
Szekesfehervar
Burial sites of the Capetian House of Anjou